Taleb Rikani (born 23 June 1990) is an Iranian professional footballer who plays as an attacking midfielder for Sanat Naft Abadan in the Persian Gulf Pro League.

Club career
Rikani began his career with Sanat Naft Abadan F.C. from the Iran Pro League and played 16 matches. After the relegation, he went to Foolad and played ten games with two goals; they finished 4th. Rikani then returned to Sanat Naft again and he played in the Azadegan League.

Career statistics

External links
 
 http://ffiri.ir/en/club/1st-Division-League-Clubs/102/Naft-Abadan/10013/
 

Living people
1990 births
Sportspeople from Khuzestan province
Iranian footballers
Association football midfielders
Sanat Naft Abadan F.C. players
Foolad FC players
Esteghlal Ahvaz players
Sepahan S.C. footballers
Esteghlal Khuzestan F.C. players